Luis Ayala may refer to:
Luis Ayala (baseball) (born 1978), Mexican baseball player
Luis Ayala (politician), Chilean socialist politician
Luis Ayala (tennis) (born 1932), Chilean tennis player